Surya Pratap Sharma is an Indian arm wrestler. He had won silver and bronze medal at the World Cup Championship Poland (Romania) in the year 2017.

Early life and education
Surya was born in Muradih village of Deoria district in Uttar Pradesh. He grew up in this village. His father was a Staff Commissioner in Ganna Sansthan. He became disabled due to polio when he was just one and a half years old.
Surya pursued M.B.A from Dr. Shakuntala Mishra National Rehabilitation University, Lucknow. 
His interest in the Arm Wrestling was developed during an arm wrestling competition held in K.K.C, Lucknow. He practiced further in this field and became a winner of the State Championship in 2013 after defeating 110 people in arm wrestling.  Later, he won several national level championships such as National Arm Wrestling Championship in Delhi, Talkatora in 2014 with a gold medal.

Wins
World Championship in Bulgariya (Europe) World Rank- 4
World Cup Championship Poland (Romia) Silver & Bronze Medal 2017

References 

1994 births
Living people
People from Uttar Pradesh